Sweden Social Web Camp (SSWC) is a Swedish user-generated conference (or unconference) held on the island of Tjärö, Karlshamn Municipality. The event focuses on internet and web technology and use in the context of social media. The format is open, participatory workshop-events, the content of which is provided by the participants. As anyone can decide to run a workshop during the event other, non-social web, subjects have of course turned up on the unconference grid.

History 

In 2009, Tomas Wennström and Kristin Heinonen told some friends via their blog that they were considering meeting up a few people on an island and talk about the social web. Within hours, they had nearly a hundred replies from people who wanted to come, and they decided that they should try to do something for a wider audience. Eventually 286 people attended a two-day Sweden Social Web Camp in 2009, and workshops on about 60 different topics 

In 2010, 409 people attended Sweden Social Web Camp. A book, SSWC-boken, was crowdsourced by Mattias Boström and 180+ essays making up 591 pages were printed and sold at the event. Many of the essays were also workshop topics at the event itself.

In 2011, about 400 people attended  an expanded format where an extra day was added and the agenda for the first day was crowdsourced beforehand and voted on. By some, this year was considered the best year so far.

Structure 

The first two years (2009, 2010) was held as a traditional unconference where the content was decided by the participants on the spot, booking locations on the island using the unconference grid. The third year an extra day was added and the suggested topics were crowd-sourced beforehand and an online voting system was used to vote for the most popular topics. The 35 topics with the highest votes were allocated a slot on the first day.

Organised travel, called the Twittering buses, contributes to the event and many consider travelling with the buses an essential part of the experience.

See also 
 Unconference

References

External links 

 Sweden Social Web Camp web site
 Comprehensive link list for content about SSWC 2009
 Comprehensive link list for content about SSWC 2010
 Comprehensive link list for content about SSWC 2011
 Så kanske SSWC kan bli ännu bättre (This way maybe SSWC can become even better), Sydsvenskan, retrieved 16 August 2011
 Internetmänniskor invaderar Blekingeö (Internet people invade Blekinge island), DN.se, retrieved 16 August 2011
 Framtidens internet tar form (The future of the internet takes shape), Expressen/Kvällsposten, retrieved 16 August 2011
 Webbeliten samlades i Blekinges skärgård (The web elite got together in the archipelago of Blekinge), Metro Teknik, 25 August 2009, retrieved 16 August 2011.

Web-related conferences
Social information processing
Unconferences